"We Are the People" is a song by Dutch DJ Martin Garrix, featuring Bono and the Edge from Irish rock band U2. It was officially released on 14 May 2021 as the official song for the UEFA Euro 2020. It was first performed in full at a virtual opening ceremony at the Stadio Olimpico in Rome.

Music video
The video of the song was filmed in London, England, and includes Bono and the Edge of Irish rock band U2. The video contains some footage from the group's performance at Slane Castle in 2001.

UEFA Euro 2020

On 19 October 2019, Garrix was announced as the official music artist of the tournament. He produced the official song of the tournament, as well as the walkout music preceding matches and the television broadcast music.

Credits and personnel
Martin Garrix – producer, songwriter, composer
The Edge – songwriter, composer
Bono – vocals, songwriter
Simon Carmody – songwriter
Giorgio Tuinfort – songwriter, composer, piano
Albin Nedler – songwriter, composer, background vocals
Kristoffer Fogelmark – songwriter, composer, background vocals
Pierre-Luc Rioux – additional guitar
Frank van Essen – strings

Charts

Weekly charts

Year-end charts

Certifications

References

2021 songs
2021 singles
Martin Garrix songs
Bono songs
The Edge songs
Football songs and chants
Music videos directed by Hannah Lux Davis
Songs written by Albin Nedler
Songs written by Bono
Songs written by Giorgio Tuinfort
Songs written by Kristoffer Fogelmark
Songs written by Martin Garrix
Songs written by the Edge
UEFA Euro 2020
UEFA European Championship official songs and anthems